The Roman Catholic Diocese of Honolulu comprises nine vicariates forane consisting of its member parishes.

West Honolulu Vicariate

 Cathedral Basilica of Our Lady of Peace, Downtown Honolulu, (Oahu)
 Co-Cathedral of Saint Theresa of the Child Jesus, Kalihi-Palama, (Oahu) +Vietnamese Holy Martyrs Catholic Community
 Blessed Sacrament Catholic Church, Pauoa Valley, (Oahu)
 Holy Family Catholic Church, Airport Area, (Oahu)
 Our Lady of the Mount Catholic Church (Honolulu), Kalihi Valley, (Oahu)
 Saint Anthony Catholic Church, Kalihi-Kai, (Oahu)
 Saint John the Baptist Catholic Church, Kalihi, (Oahu)
 Saint Philomena Catholic Church, Salt Lake, (Oahu)
 Saint Stephen Catholic Church, Nuuanu, (Oahu)

East Honolulu Vicariate
The Mānoa-Punahou Catholic Community, a clustered parish consisting of Sacred Heart Catholic Church on Wilder Avenue and Saint Pius X Catholic Church in Mānoa Valley was canonically erected by the Bishop of Honolulu.

 Holy Trinity Catholic Church, Kuliouou, (Oahu)
 Mary, Star of the Sea Catholic Church, Waialae-Kahala, (Oahu)
Newman Center/Holy Spirit Catholic Church, University of Hawaii at Manoa, (Oahu)
 Sacred Heart Church-Punahou (Manoa), (Oahu)
 Saint Augustine by the Sea Catholic Church, Waikiki, (Oahu)
 Saint Patrick Catholic Church, Kaimuki, (Oahu)
 Saint Pius X Catholic Church, Manoa, (Oahu) +Korean Catholic Community
 Saints Peter and Paul Catholic Church (Honolulu), Ala Moana, (Oahu)
St. Pius-X Church, Lowrey Avenue Manoa.

Leeward Oahu Vicariate
N.B. In 2008 the Diocese split the former Leeward Vicariate into two separate Vicariates; Leeward (Oahu) Vicariate and Central (Oahu) Vicariate

 Immaculate Conception Catholic Church, Ewa, (Oahu)
 Our Lady of Perpetual Help Catholic Church, Ewa Beach, (Oahu)
 Sacred Heart Catholic Church, Waianae, (Oahu)
 Saint Joseph Catholic Church, Waipahu, (Oahu)
 Saint Jude Catholic Church, Makakilo, (Oahu)
 Saint Rita Catholic Church, Nanakuli, (Oahu)

Central Oahu Vicariate
N.B. In 2008 the Diocese split the former Leeward Vicariate into two separate Vicariates; Leeward (Oahu) Vicariate and Central (Oahu), Molokai Vicariate

 Our Lady of Good Counsel Catholic Church, Pearl City, (Oahu)
 Our Lady of Sorrows Catholic Church, Wahiawa, (Oahu)
 Resurrection of the Lord Catholic Church, Waipio, (Oahu)
 Saint Elizabeth Catholic Church, Aiea, (Oahu)
 Saint John Apostle and Evangelist Catholic Church, Mililani, (Oahu)
 Saint Michael Catholic Church, Waialua, (Oahu) +Saints Peter and Paul Catholic Mission, Waimea Bay (Oahu)
 Saint Damien of Molokai Catholic Church, Kaunakakai, (Molokai) +Our Lady of Seven Sorrows Catholic Mission, Kaluaaha, (Molokai) +Saint Vincent Ferrer Catholic Mission, Maunaloa, (Molokai)
 Saint Francis Catholic Church, Kalaupapa, (Molokai) +Saint Philomena Catholic Mission, Kalawao, (Molokai)

Windward Oahu Vicariate

 Our Lady of Mount Carmel Catholic Church, Waikane (Kaneohe), (Oahu)
 Saint Ann Church Catholic Church, Kaneohe, (Oahu)
 Saint Anthony of Padua Catholic Church, Kailua, (Oahu)
 Saint George Catholic Church, Waimanalo, (Oahu)
 Saint John Vianney Catholic Church, Kailua, (Oahu)
 Saint Roch Catholic Church, Kahuku, (Oahu) +Saint Joachim Catholic Mission, Punaluu, (Oahu)

West Hawaii Vicariate

 Annunciation Catholic Church, Waimea, (Hawaii)
 Kalikonani (Ascension) Catholic Mission, Puako, (Hawaii)
 Our Lady of Lourdes Catholic Church, Honokaa, (Hawaii)
 Most Sacred Heart of Jesus Catholic Church, Hawi, (Hawaii)
 Saint Benedict Catholic Church, Honaunau, (Hawaii) +Saint John the Baptist Catholic Mission, Kealakekua, (Hawaii)
 St. Michael the Archangel Catholic Church, Kailua-Kona, (Hawaii) +Immaculate Conception Catholic Mission, Holualoa, (Hawaii) +Holy Rosary Catholic Mission, Kalaoa, (Hawaii) +Saint Paul Catholic Mission, Honalo, (Hawaii) +Saint Peter by the Sea Catholic Mission, Kahaluu, (Hawaii)

East Hawaii Vicariate

 Holy Rosary Catholic Church, Pahala, (Hawaii)
 Immaculate Heart of Mary Catholic Church, Papaikou, (Hawaii) +Good Shepherd Catholic Mission, Honomu, (Hawaii)
 Malia Puka O Kalani (Mary, Gate of Heaven) Catholic Church, Keaukaha (Hilo), (Hawaii)
 Sacred Heart Catholic Church, Naalehu, (Hawaii)
 Sacred Heart Catholic Church, Pahoa, (Hawaii)
 Saint Anthony Catholic Church, Papaaloa, (Hawaii)
 Saint Joseph Catholic Church, Hilo, (Hawaii)
 Saint Theresa Catholic Church, Mountain View, (Hawaii) +Holy Rosary Catholic Mission, Keaau, (Hawaii)

Kauai Vicariate

 Holy Cross Catholic Church, Kalaheo, (Kauai) +Sacred Heart Catholic Mission, Eleele, (Kauai)
 Immaculate Conception Catholic Church, Lihue, (Kauai)
 Saint Catherine Catholic Church, Kapaa, (Kauai) +Saint Sylvester Catholic Mission, Kilauea, (Kauai) +Saint William Catholic Mission, Hanalei, (Kauai)
 Saint Raphael Catholic Church, Koloa, (Kauai)
 Saint Theresa Catholic Church, Kekaha, (Kauai) +Sacred Hearts of Jesus and Mary Catholic Mission, Waimea, (Kauai)

Maui Vicariate

 Christ the King Catholic Church, Kahului, (Maui)
 Holy Rosary Catholic Church, Paia, (Maui)
 Maria Lanakila Catholic Church, Lahaina, (Maui) +Sacred Hearts Catholic Mission, Kapalua, (Maui) 
 Our Lady Queen of Angels Catholic Church, Keokea (Kula), (Maui) +Holy Ghost Catholic Mission, Waiakoa, (Maui) +Saint James the Less Catholic Mission, Ulupalakua, (Maui) 
 Saint Ann Catholic Church, Waihee, (Maui) +Saint Francis Xavier Catholic Mission, Kahakuloa, (Maui)
 Saint Anthony of Padua Catholic Church, Wailuku, (Maui) 
 Saint Joseph Catholic Church, Makawao, (Maui)
 Saint Mary Catholic Church, Hana, (Maui) +Saint Peter Catholic Mission, Puuiki, (Maui) +Saint Paul Catholic Mission, Kipahulu, (Maui) +Saint Joseph Catholic Mission, Kaupo, (Maui)
 Saint Rita Catholic Church, Haiku, (Maui) +Saint Gabriel Catholic Mission, Keanae, (Maui)
 Saint Theresa Catholic Church, Kihei, (Maui)
 Sacred Hearts Catholic Church, Lanai City, (Lanai)

See also
List of Catholic churches in the United States

 
Honolulu
parishes of the Roman Catholic Diocese of Honolulu